The SIG SG 530 was a Swiss assault rifle developed in the 1960s by Schweizerische Industrie Gesellschaft (SIG) to take the then-new  M193 ball and M196 tracer .223 Remington military rounds.

Development
Development of the rifle started in 1963 as a joint project between SIG and Beretta. The latter had already cooperated with SIG on the production of the SG 510-4 rifle for Chile. Initial prototypes of the 5.56 mm rifle used the delayed-blowback operating system of the SIG SG 510. However, this operating system proved to be problematic with the relatively "weak" 5.56×45mm NATO intermediate cartridge, and the designers were forced to use a gas-operated, roller-locked system. In 1968, Beretta ceased development with SIG, and went to work on their own 5.56 mm rifle design resulting in the outwardly similar AR70, later known as AR70/223. Due to a lack of sales, SIG abandoned the SG 530 in the 1970s in favor of developing the SG 540 series.

Bibliography
 Hogg, Ian V. and Weeks, John S. Military Small Arms of the 20th Century. Iola, WI, 7th edition, 2000. Pages 280–281. .

See also
SIG SG 540
SIG SG 550
SIG Sauer SIG516
Beretta AR70/90
FARA 83
List of assault rifles

References

5.56×45mm NATO assault rifles
Assault rifles of Switzerland
SIG Sauer rifles